140th Brigade may refer to:

 140th Anti-Aircraft Rocket Brigade, Russia
 140th Mixed Brigade, Spain
 140th (4th London) Brigade, United Kingdom